The phrase Reagan tax cuts refers to changes to the United States federal tax code passed during the presidency of Ronald Reagan. There were two major tax cuts: The Economic Recovery Tax Act of 1981 and the Tax Reform Act of 1986. The tax cuts popularized the now infamous phrase "Trickle-down economics" as it was primarily used as a moniker by opponents of the bill in order to degrade supply-side economics, the driving principle used to promote the tax cuts.

The first tax cut (The Economic Recovery Tax Act of 1981) among other things, cut the highest Personal Income Tax rate from 70% to 50% and the lowest from 14% to 11% and decreased the highest Capital Gains Tax rate from 28% to 20%. 
The second tax cut (The Tax Reform Act of 1986) among other things, cut the highest Personal Income Tax rate from 50% to 38.5% but decreasing to 28% in the following years and increased the highest Capital Gains Tax rate from 20% to 28%.

At the time, people weren't substantially informed about the tax cuts, as an ABC News Poll in September 1986 showed that 63% of Americans didn't know enough about the Tax Reform Act of 1986 to say if it was good or bad.

Historical Tax Rates

The top marginal income tax rate, that is, the rate paid on the 'last dollar' of the highest earner's income, was increased to 77% on the 2 millionth dollar earned during and to help finance the cost of fighting World War I. This rate was cut over a period of 5 years following the war to a low of 25% in 1925, and tax collection as a share of output fell dramatically. In response to pressure from a now Democratic Party-controlled Congress, President Herbert Hoover reluctantly agreed to raise the top marginal rate to finance relief programs. In the resulting Revenue Act of 1932 the top marginal tax rate was raised from 25% to 63%.  The top marginal rate was again raised in 1936 and 1940.  In 1941, the Empire of Japan attacked the United States at Pearl Harbor.  In response, the Congress declared war on Japan and Germany and enacted an additional tax increase to help finance new war spending - raising the top marginal rate to its all-time-high of 94% on the $200,000th earned ($3.2M in 2021 dollars).  Following the War, Congress reduced the top marginal rate to a low of 82.13% on the 200,000th dollar in 1949.  The top marginal rate fluctuated between 70% and 92% on the 200,000th to the 400,000th dollar (the bracket on which the rate was charged was changed as well) over the following 20 years. During this time the Social Security Act created a Social Security tax, though because the Social Security tax is capped at ~$130,000 per individual this did not add to the overall top marginal rate.  Under President John F. Kennedy the top marginal rate was decreased in the Revenue Act of 1964 to 70%.  In 1980 Ronald Reagan was elected and promised to cut the top marginal tax rate.  This he did, and the top marginal tax rate was lowered over his 8 years in office from 73% to 28% on incomes over just $29,750 - the lowest this rate had been since 1925.

Economic Implications

Economic Gains
Unemployment fell from 7.5% in 1981 to 5.4% in 1989 after peaking at 10.8% in 1982.
Inflation fell from 11.8% when Reagan entered office to 4.7% when he left.
The US Average Real Income grew by 16.8% from 1980-1989.

Economic Costs
The US Federal Tax Revenue as % of the GDP decreased from 18.5 to 17.4 from 1980–1990.
The budget deficit increased from $74 billion in 1980 to $221 billion in 1990.
The budget deficit as a % of GDP increased from 2.6% in 1980 to 2.7% in 1989.
 The national debt as a percentage of GDP increased by 62% from 30.9% in 1981 when Reagan took office to 49.9% when he left.
 Median real wages dropped by 0.6% by 1990, as compared with 1980.

Tax Incentives Post-Tax Cut
After the Economic Recovery Tax Act of 1981 revenues fell by 6% in real terms. This promoted a tax increase that passed the House in late 1981 and the Senate in mid-1982 called the Tax Equity and Fiscal Responsibility Act of 1982. This act was an agreement between Reagan and the Congress that raised revenues for the following years. Following that increase, there were 3 other tax increases from 1983-1987 for other various reasons. In total, the US lost over $200 billion in 2012 chained dollars due to the original tax cut in the first four years and around $1 billion for the second tax cut. Revenues grew from 1982-1987 by a total of $137 billion in revenue which adds up to roughly $64 billion in net revenue lost because of the cuts.

See also
Reaganomics
Bush tax cuts
Taxation history of the United States

References

External links
Full Text of the Economic Recovery Act of 1981
Full Text of the Tax Reform Act of 1986

Further reading
 Monica Prasad, "The popular origins of neoliberalism in the Reagan tax cut of 1981." Journal of Policy History 24.3 (2012): 351-383.</ref>

Tax reform in the United States